This article lists events that occurred during 1930 in Estonia.

Incumbents

Events
Economic Depression in Estonia.

Births
31 May – Uno Loop, Estonian singer

Deaths

References

 
1930s in Estonia
Estonia
Estonia
Years of the 20th century in Estonia